Alabama has several minor league professional and semi-professional teams including three minor league baseball teams. It does not currently have any major professional sports league teams, and has never hosted a team in any of the established U.S. major professional leagues. However, Alabama has intermittently been home to teams in what were widely considered (and/or at least aspired to become) major leagues during their presence in the state.

Currently, Alabama is the second-most populous U.S. state without a major league franchise (it is the most populous if one considers Virginia to be the home of the NFL's Washington Commanders and NHL's Washington Capitals - those teams have their practice facilities and operational headquarters in Northern Virginia although neither team plays its home games there).

Current minor-league professional and semi-professional teams

Notes

Former professional and semi-professional teams

References

Alabama

Professional sports teams in Alabama